Wailin' for Love is an album by Junior Marvin released in 2007.

Track listing

Personnel 
 Junior Marvin - Lead Vocals, Lead Guitar, Bass Guitar, Keyboard, Producer
 Aston Barrett - Bass Guitar
 Marcelo Nassar - Bass Guitar
 Bugs - Bass Guitar
 Sly Dunbar - Drums
 Trevor Morell - Drums
 Carlton Barrett - Drums
 Mauricio Nassar - Drums
 Georges Kouakou - Keyboard
 Tyrone Downie - Keyboard
 Earl Wya Lindo - Keyboard
 Fernando DeJesus - Keyboard
 Leroy Romans - Keyboard
 Christopher Drummond - Strings
 Cynthia Guinn - Backing Vocals
 Rita Norman - Backing Vocals
 Ronnie Quaries - Backing Vocals
 Drew Hawkins - Cover Art
 Matthew Thibodeau - Tour Coordinator
 Ron Lebow - Legal
 David Baumann - Legal
 Jim Fox - Engineer
 Christopher Drummond - Engineer

Junior Marvin albums
2007 albums